Steuart Smith (born 24 June 1952) is an American guitarist and multi-instrumentalist, vocalist, writer and producer from Arlington, Virginia, United States. He is a touring member of the American rock band Eagles, where he has performed as one of the lead guitarists since 2001.

Career
Smith was hired by the Eagles in 2001 after Don Felder was fired from the band due to legal disputes. He shared lead guitar duties with Joe Walsh, such as the harmonizing duet in "Hotel California".

In addition to performing live with the band, he played on and co-wrote several songs on the Eagles' 2007 studio album Long Road Out of Eden, on which he also shared producing duties with the four band members and drummer Scott Crago.

Smith was a member of Don Henley's solo touring band and occasionally played concerts with Glenn Frey. He and Scott Crago were in Henley's touring band for his 2016 world tour.

Smith was also a member of Rodney Crowell's band, Cicadas, which released one album in 1997.

References

1952 births
Living people
American country guitarists
American male guitarists
American rock guitarists
Lead guitarists
Songwriters from Maryland
American male singers
American country mandolinists
Musicians from Baltimore
People from Arlington County, Virginia
Eagles (band)
Guitarists from Maryland
20th-century American guitarists